C.H.U.D. is a 1984 American science fiction horror film directed by Douglas Cheek, produced by Andrew Bonime, and starring John Heard, Daniel Stern, and Christopher Curry in his film debut. The plot concerns a New York City police officer and a homeless shelter manager who team up to investigate a series of disappearances, and discover that the missing people have been killed by humanoid monsters that live in the sewers.

The title of the movie is an abbreviation that stands for Cannibalistic Humanoid Underground Dwellers.

The film was released in North America on August 31, 1984 and grossed $4.7 million. It was followed in 1989 by a sequel titled C.H.U.D. II: Bud the C.H.U.D..

Plot
The film opens with a woman, Flora Bosch, walking her dog down an empty, darkened city street. As she passes by a manhole, a creature attacks Mrs. Bosch and drags her and the dog into the sewers.

George Cooper, a once-prominent fashion photographer, has since forgone fame and fortune and is living with his girlfriend Lauren. His current project is photographing New York City's homeless population, specifically those known as "undergrounders", or people who reside in the city's sewers and subway tunnels.

NYPD Captain Bosch has a personal interest in the recent flood of missing persons being reported to his precinct, as Flora—his wife—is also missing. Bosch interviews A.J. "The Reverend" Shepherd, who runs the local homeless shelter. A.J. believes that the recent events are part of a massive government cover-up and has the evidence to prove it. Bosch's superiors know more than they are letting on and seem to be taking their cues from Wilson, who works for the Nuclear Regulatory Commission (NRC).

It turns out that monsters are lurking beneath the streets: beings that were once human, but have been mutated by radioactive, chemical toxic waste into hideous, flesh-eating creatures that prey on the homeless who live in the underground. Given the recent drop in the underground transient population, the creatures have resorted to coming to the surface through sewer manholes to feed. Through a series of events, both George and A.J. find themselves trapped in the sewers, a reporter gets involved and eaten, and Lauren has a problem with both a clogged shower drain and a mutant that comes up through the sewer access point that she opened in the basement of her apartment building.

A.J. and George meet up and discover that the Nuclear Regulatory Commission is directly involved in the slaughter that has been going on. Although the political bureaucracy has forbidden the NRC to transport the toxic wastes through New York because of the large-scale danger to the public, it has secretly been hiding the waste by-products, marked as "Contamination Hazard Urban Disposal", beneath Manhattan in the abandoned subway tunnels. The underground homeless population has been coming into contact with these by-products, turning them into the mutated creatures. To protect this secret, Wilson plans to seal the sewers, open up some gas lines and asphyxiate the C.H.U.D.s and any witnesses of their existence, despite the inherent danger to the city. In the meantime, Lauren is attacked by the mutants in her apartment and narrowly escapes them.

Later that evening at a diner, two police officers and the waitress are killed and carried off by the mutants, finally drawing the public's attention to the disappearances. George and A.J. recover a camera set left behind by an NRC crew slain by the mutants during a previous clean-up attempt and use it to report their findings to Bosch. Confronted by Bosch, Wilson runs off, and later shoots Bosch while the latter helps A.J. and George escape from a manhole. Wilson then tries to run George and A.J. over with a truck, but A.J. fatally shoots Wilson with Bosch's gun, and the truck explodes as it drives into the manhole.

Cast

Release

Theatrical release
C.H.U.D. was given a limited release theatrically by New World Pictures beginning in August 1984. The film opened at #13 at the box office, grossing $1,762,922 with an average gross of $5,686 in 310 theaters. Its second week saw it dropping to #14 at the box office, with a gross of only $834,465 and a worldwide gross of $2,846,756.

Home media
C.H.U.D. was released for home video on Betamax and VHS by Media Home Entertainment in 1984. The film was released on DVD by Anchor Bay Entertainment on January 30, 2001. The company released the film again in 2008 as a part of its Cult Fiction series. Image Entertainment would release the film in 2011, and in 2012, with the later release being a part of a two-disc multi-feature alongside Children of the Corn, Creepshow 2, and House. A two-disc Special Edition was released on Blu-ray by Arrow Video on November 22, 2016. That version is now out of print. A new one disc Blu-ray was released on November 9, 2021.

Reception

Rotten Tomatoes, a review aggregator, reports a 29% approval rating based on 14 reviews; the average rating is 3.89/10. Lawrence Van Gelder from The New York Times stated in his review for the film, "C.H.U.D. makes no pretension toward serious thesis about government or the environment. It is meant to be light commercial entertainment, and in the category of horror films it stands as a praiseworthy effort". Keith Phipps of The A.V. Club wrote, "Perfect for bleary-eyed late-night viewing and pretty much unwatchable at any other hour." Patrick Naugle of DVD Verdict called it a fun film that focuses more on entertainment than deeper issues.  Joshua Rothkopf of Time Out New York included it in Time Outs list of best New York-set films, calling it "more funny than scary".  Bloody Disgusting rated it 4.5/5 stars and called it "definitely one of b-movies best kept secrets".

It won Best Fantasy Film at Brussels International Festival of Fantasy Film in 1985.

Legacy 

A sequel, C.H.U.D. II: Bud the C.H.U.D., was released in 1989. Although C.H.U.D. was negatively received during its initial release, it attracted a cult following over the years, inspired the name of a film website (which changed the acronym's meaning to Cinematic Happenings Under Development) and a political epithet, and references to it have appeared in The Simpsons, The CW's The Flash, Aqua Teen Hunger Force, Clerks II, Castle, Archer, Futurama, Pushing Daisies, Outer Banks, Agents of S.H.I.E.L.D., and Rick and Morty. Martin Cooper's score was later named number 33 in Rolling Stone'''s 35 Greatest Horror Soundtracks. The film was also the subject of an April Fool's hoax announcement by The Criterion Collection. In 2007, Rob Zombie was rumored to be considering a remake, and, in 2008, a different remake was rumored to be in production. In 2014, an original, collectible poster for the film was released. C.H.U.D appears in the 2003 video game Tony Hawk's Underground under the name T.H.U.D. A VHS copy of C.H.U.D. appears in the opening shot of Jordan Peele's 2019 horror film Us.

The found footage horror film Dwellers has been publicly referenced by its writer and director Drew Fortier as being heavily influenced by C.H.U.D.

The anthology C.H.U.D. LIVES!: A Tribute Anthology, edited by Joe Mynhardt, was released in 2018 and featured an introduction by David Drake, an interview with the late C.H.U.D. movie producer Andrew Bonime, an interview horror author Eric S. Brown did with C.H.U.D. screenwriter Parnell Hall and nineteen stories set in the universe of the movie C.H.U.D. Contributors included Robert E. Waters, Nick Cato, Ryan C. Thomas, David Robbins, Christopher Fulbright, Angeline Hawkes, Greg Mitchell, Alex Laybourne, Michael H. Hanson, Ben Fisher, Tim Waggoner, Jason White, Mort Castle, David Bernstein, Martin Powell, Chad Lutzke, J.G. Faherty, Phillip C. Perron, Ross Baxter, Jonathan Maberry, and Eugene Johnson.

See also
 The Time Machine'', an 1895 novel featuring subterranean cannibals ("Morlocks") who prey on surface-dwellers. 
 Shaver mystery, a 1940s-era purportedly-true series of stories about subterranean cannibals  ("Deros") who prey on surface-dwellers.

References

External links
 
 
 
 
 

1984 films
1984 horror films
1980s monster movies
1980s science fiction horror films
American science fiction horror films
American independent films
American monster movies
American natural horror films
Films about cannibalism
Films about homelessness
Films set in New York City
New World Pictures films
1980s English-language films
1980s American films